Behera is a popular Odia title. Anciently, "Dala-Behera" or "Behera" was an honorific title reserved for the leader of a group of soldiers. It is an honorific title of Gopal (Yadav) caste. 

Primarily, in Odisha it is used by Gopals, Khandayats, Chasas etc. It is also used by some Brahmins and Karanas.

Sometimes, it is also used for own caste priest of inferior communities (which do not have Brahmin priest) like Kaibartas (also termed as Keuta) and Chamars (may also refer as Khajuria) etc. 
 
It was also adopted by Koli people of Ganjam district, who migrated from South India.

Notable People
 Bhagabat Behera, Former Cabinet Minister (O.L.A)
 Bhubaneswar Behera, Indian Scholar.
 Chakradhar Behera, Freedom Fighter & Politician.
 Daitari Behera, Indian Politician.
 Deepak Behera, Indian Cricketer.
 Dharmananda Behera, Indian Politician
 Digambar Behera, Indian Physician.
 Jayanta Behera, Indian Cricketer.
 Jayanti Behera, Indian Sprinter.
 Lokanath Behera, D.G.P of Kerala state Police.
 Madhusmita Behera, Indian Cricketer.
 Mandakini Behera, Indian Politician.
 Nandita Behera, Indian odissi Dancer.
 Natraj Behera, Indian Cricketer.
 Niranjan Behera, Indian Cricketer.
 Prasanta Behera, Indian Politician.
 Ritwik Behera, American cricketer
 Shashi Bhusan Behera, Indian Politician

See also 
 Koli piracy in India
 Koli rebellions
 List of Koli people
 List of Koli states and clans

References

Odia people
Koli titles